The Guntersville Lake Hydrofest is an H1 Unlimited hydroplane boat race held annually in June on Guntersville Lake in northern Alabama near Guntersville.

History 
The first unlimited hydroplane race held in Guntersville took place in 1963. The small northern Alabama town was traditionally host to the unlimited hydroplane season opener from 1963 until 1969. The race was not run not run in 1967 or 1968.  Unlimited hydroplane racing returned to Guntersville with a test session in 2017 and a full-fledged national high point race in 2018. Since 2018 the Guntersville Lake Hydrofest has opened the H1 Unlimited season, and the unlimited class competes for the Southern Cup.

Past Results

References 

Racing motorboats
H1 Unlimited
Hydroplanes
Motorboat racing